Maria Dias may refer to:
 Maria Dias (footballer), Brazilian footballer
 Maria Berenice Dias, Brazilian judge
 Maria Helena da Costa Dias, Portuguese writer